Thirukumaresar Temple (also called Erukathampuliyur temple or Rajendirapattinam temple) is a Hindu temple dedicated to the deity Shiva, located in Thirukoodalaiyathoor, a village in Cuddalore district in the South Indian state of Tamil Nadu. Shiva is worshipped as Thirukumaresar, and is represented by the lingam. His consort Parvati is depicted as Verumulai Amman. The presiding deity is revered in the 7th century Tamil Saiva canonical work, the Tevaram, written by Tamil saint poets known as the Nayanars and classified as Paadal Petra Sthalam. The temple is also the birthplace of Saiva saint Tirunilakanta Nayanar

The temple complex covers around half acre and entered through a five tiered gopuram, the main gateway. The temple has a number of shrines, with those of Thirukumaresar and his consorts Verumulai Amman, being the most prominent. All the shrines of the temple are enclosed in large concentric rectangular granite walls.

The temple has four daily rituals at various times from 6:00 a.m. to 8:30 p.m., and four yearly festivals on its calendar. Mahasivarathri festival celebrated during the month of the Chittirai (March - April) is the most prominent festival of the temple.

Legend

As per Hindu legend, once Shiva was explaining the importance of Vedas and Agamas to Parvathi in Kailash. She was not paying attention and Shiva cursed her to born in earth in Bharathava community. Muruga, their son was angered that his father cursed Parvathi and argued with him. Shiva was further angered and he cursed Muruga also be born as a dumb boy in trader community. He was born as Rudrasarma in Madurai to an army lieutenant. The boy went to many Shiva temples for relief and when he finally came to the temple for worship, he got his speech. 
 
As per another legend, the celestial deities were enjoying the place and took the form of birds. Some hunters were trying to hunt them and by divine intervention, the hunters turned into Erukam trees whose wood is not useful. Thus the place came to be known as Erukathampuliyur.

Architecture
Thirukumaresar temple is located in  Vridhachalam - Jayankondam highway,  from Vridhachalam. The temple has a three-tiered gateway tower and all the shrines of the temple are enclosed in concentric rectangular granite walls. The central shrine houses the image of Thirukumaresar in the form of Lingam. The shrine of Veramulai Amman, the consort of Shiva facing West is located in the Mahamandapam leading to the sanctum. The central shrine is approached through the flagstaff and Mahamandapam, both which are located axial to the gateway. As in other Shiva temples in Tamil Nadu, the shrines of Vinayaka, Murugan, Navagraha, Chandikesa and Durga are located around the precinct of the main shrine. The temple tank is located opposite to the temple and is called Nilorpala Theertham. There is a shrine for Thiruneelakanta Nayanar and Sattanathar at an elevated plane. There are images of Thiruneelakanta Yazhpanar along with Mathanga Choodamaniyar. The shrines around the sanctum houses the images of Mahaganapathi, Viswanathar, Visalatchi, Murugar and Lakshmi.

The original complex is believed to have been built by Cholas, while the present masonry structure was built during the Nayak during the 16th century. In modern times, the temple is maintained and administered by the Hindu Religious and Charitable Endowments Department of the Government of Tamil Nadu.

Religious importance

It is one of the shrines of the 275 Paadal Petra Sthalams - Shiva Sthalams glorified in the early medieval Tevaram poems by Tamil Saivite Nayanars Appar, Sambandar and Sundarar. Raja Raja Chola, the greatest Chola king is believed to have worshipped Shiva at this place and was blessed with Rajendra I. He named the place Rajendirapattinam after the incident. During five days from 16 to 20 March, Sun's rays fall directly on the image of the presiding deity. The temple is also known to be the birthplace of Tirunilakanta Nayanar, one of the 63 Nayanmars.

This is one of the Nava Puliyur Temples worshipped by Patanjali and Vyaghrapada. The nine Nava Puliyur temples are Perumpatrapuliyur, Thirupathiripuliyur, Erukathampuliyur, Omampuliyur, Sirupuliyur, Atthippuliyur, Thaplampuliyur, Perumpuliyur and  Kanattampuliyur.

Festivals
The temple priests perform the puja (rituals) during festivals and on a daily basis. The temple rituals are performed four times a day; Kalasanthi at 8:00 a.m., Uchikalam at 12:00 a.m., Sayarakshai at 6:00 p.m,  and Arthajamam at 8:00 p.m.. Each ritual comprises four steps: abhisheka (sacred bath), alangaram (decoration), naivethanam (food offering) and deepa aradanai (waving of lamps) for Thirukumaresar and Verumulai Amman. Mahasivarathri during the Tamil month of Panguni (March - April) is the most important festivals of the temple.

References

External links

Hindu temples in Cuddalore district
Padal Petra Stalam